St. John's Parish is a Roman Catholic church located at 2500 California Plaza on the Creighton University campus in Omaha, Nebraska, United States. It is within the Archdiocese of Omaha and is a ministry of the Midwest Province of the Society of Jesus (Jesuits).

History
The cornerstone was laid on May 6, 1888, drawing 4,000 people, which was the largest crowd ever assembled in Nebraska up to that point. The building was designed by local architect P.J. Creedon in the English Gothic style. In 1897 the church was made a regular parish after the city's original bishop intended for it to only serve as a temporary church for the college-age attendees. John A. Creighton donated much of the original funding for the building. Mary Creighton, John's brother Edward's wife, donated jewelry to the parish construction fund before there was a building.

In 1923 an addition to the building was consecrated by Bishop Patrick A. McGovern, a member of the first graduation class of Creighton College and the only bishop ever consecrated in St. John's.

Renovations to the building were completed in 2006.  In February 2015, an elevator was added to the side of St. John's to make the lower level accessible from the main church.

See also
 History of Omaha
 List of Jesuit sites

References

External links
 St. John's Church at Creighton University website
 Historic postcard of St. John's
 Historic images and postcards including St. John's

Creighton University
Roman Catholic churches in Omaha, Nebraska
History of Omaha, Nebraska
Jesuit churches in the United States
Roman Catholic churches completed in 1888
19th-century Roman Catholic church buildings in the United States
Gothic Revival church buildings in Nebraska